My Fair Lady is a 2003 South Korean television drama produced and first broadcast by SBS. It has a total of 16 episodes, and is a remake of the 2000 Japanese drama Yamatonadeshiko (やまとなでしこ), which aired on Fuji Television.

Plot
Min-kyung, is a fresh high school graduate. She has worked in a liquor restaurant to pay off her father's gambling debt. However, Min-kyung borrowed some money and ran away, hoping to find a rich man as her spouse. Meanwhile, Young Ho is the son of a poor rice cake house owner, and works to pay off his dead father's debt. He falls in love with Min-kyung, because she looks exactly like his dead girlfriend. When Min Kyung finds out that Young Ho is not rich, she dumps him, and goes back to a rich man (Son Chang Min) who proposed to Min Kyung once before. However, Min Kyung wakes up to true love and realizes that happiness does not necessarily come in money.

Young-ho's father Moon Dae-cha (Lee Soon-jae) observed his diligence and decided to give Young-ho a chance to prove his worth in comparison with Dong-kyu (There is no scene that Young-ho realized that Moon Dae-cha is his illegitimate biological father, and the poor rice cake house owner is not his birth father, but a stepfather). Young-ho's father announced that there would be a fair competition from the two men to prove their worth and decide the heir to the company.

That same night, Young-ho's father met Min-kyung's father. Dong-kyu's father, who was drunk, knocked down the duo as they were talking to each other and crossing the road. Dong-kyu was seen rushing and persuaded his father to escape while he called for an ambulance.

Dong-kyu used this opportunity to gain advantage over Young-ho in the competition to become the heir, with his father's help. Young-ho, on the other hand, was having a hard time struggling to compete against Dong-kyu and his acts of sabotage.

Young-ho was shocked when he saw his father at the meeting. Young-ho was declared to be the heir of the company and both Dong-kyu and his father announced their resignations.

Young-ho instead wished to fulfill his long-time dream of becoming an astronomer and announced his intention of resigning as boss in order to become a full-time astronomer, after working for a few months. With the consent of his father, Young-ho took up astronomy at a space observation centre in Australia. He later married Min-kyung, and was seen swearing their wedding vows in front of a Christian priest.

Cast
 Kim Hee-sun as Ha Min-kyung
 Go Soo as Shin Young-ho
 Park Han-byul as Su-yeon
 Son Chang-min as Mun Dong-kyu
 Kwon Hae-hyo as Go Hyun-tak
 Shin Jung-hwan
 Park Joo-mi  
 Kim Jung-nan as Yoon Jung-hee
 Lee Soon-jae as Moon Dae-cha (Young-ho's illegitimate biological father)
 Sunwoo Eun-sook as Oh Nam-sook (Young-ho's mother)
 Im Hyun-sik as Ha Yeon-ku (Min-kyung's father)
 Jung Wook as Moon Dae-pyeong (Dong-kyu's's father)
 Jung Jae-soon as Baek Seol-hwa (Dong-kyu's mother)

References

External links
 My Fair Lady official SBS website
 My Fair Lady at SBS Global
 My Fair Lady at Cineseoul

Seoul Broadcasting System television dramas
2003 South Korean television series debuts
2003 South Korean television series endings
South Korean romance television series
Television series by Chorokbaem Media